= Comoedia Mundi =

Comoedia Mundi is a touring theatre group in Bavaria, Germany.
